Truck Night in America (known outside of the US as Monster Motor Challenge) is a History Channel program that debuted in 2018.

The show features contestants competing through a series of races with eliminations after each, until the last remaining is declared the winner. After the first elimination round, a selection process teams an expert coach to each remaining driver. The expert coaches include desert racing champion and truck builder "Pistol" Pete Sohren, extreme sports pioneer and dirt track racer Glen Plake, truck builder and master fabricator Abe Wine, and rock crawling champion and master fabricator Rob "Bender" Park. Once the elimination events have narrowed the contestant pool down to two, they are set to race independently against one another on a three-mile course known as "The Green Hell."  Whoever completes the course in the shortest amount of time, wins the $10,000 prize. In the event that neither cross the finish line, the contestant closest to doing so is awarded the prize. Unfortunately, in January 2019, "Pistol" Pete Sohren was killed in a UTV accident in Mexico, leaving a vacancy in the show. The show has not been renewed for a third season.

References

History (American TV channel) original programming
Modified vehicles